Sevryukovo is a rural locality (a village) in Bryansky District, Bryansk Oblast, Russia. The population was 16 as of 2013. There is 1 street.

Geography 
Sevryukovo is located 3 km southwest of Glinishchevo (the district's administrative centre) by road. Baldyzh is the nearest rural locality.

References 

Rural localities in Bryansky District